Museology